Michael Groom may refer to:

 Michael Groom (footballer), association football player who represented New Zealand 
 Michael Groom (climber) (born 1959), Australian mountain climber